Agalychnis psilopygion is a species of frog in the subfamily Phyllomedusinae. It is found in southern Colombia and north-western Ecuador. Its natural habitats are subtropical or tropical moist lowland forests, rivers, freshwater marshes, and intermittent freshwater marshes.
It is threatened by habitat loss.

References

psilopygion
Amphibians of Colombia
Amphibians of Ecuador
Amphibians described in 1980
Taxonomy articles created by Polbot